Kakiri is a town located in Wakiso District in the Central Region of Uganda.

Location
The town is located on the Kampala–Hoima Road, connecting Kampala to Uganda's oil capital of Hoima". The coordinates of Kakiri are 0°25'12.0"N, 32°23'24.0"E (Latitude:0.4200; Longitude:32.3900).

Overview
Kakiri is the site of the headquarters of the first division of the Uganda People's Defence Force (UPDF). It is also the hometown of Gilbert Bukenya, who represents the town and the surrounding constituency of Busiro North in the parliament of Uganda and is a former vice president of Uganda.

Population
In 2002, the national population census put the population of the town at about 4,200. In 2010, the Uganda Bureau of Statistics (UBOS) estimated the population at 5,800. In 2011, UBOS estimated the population at 6,000 inhabitants. In 2014, the national population census put the population at 19,449.

In 2015, UBOS estimated the population of Kakiri at 20,300. In 2020, the population agency estimated the mid-year population of the town at 28,100. Of these, 14,400 (51.2 percent) were females and 13,700 (48.8 percent were females). UBOS calculated that the population growth rate between 2015 and 2020, averaged 6.7 percent annually.

Points of interest
The following additional points of interest lie in Kakiri or near the town limits: (a) The offices of Kakiri Town Council (b) a branch of PostBank Uganda, a government-owned financial institution (c) Kakiri Central Market and (d) Kampala–Hoima Road passes through the middle of town in a northwest/southeast direction.

Photos
 Photo of the compound of the SOS Primary School in Kakiri.

See also
 List of cities and towns in Uganda

References

External links
Power Outage Disrupts Water Supply In Kakiri

Populated places in Central Region, Uganda
Wakiso District